Arcuatotilla is a genus of insects belonging to the family Mutillidae.

The only known species is Arcuatotilla arcuaticeps (André, 1905), which is found in Africa.

References

Mutillidae
Monotypic Hymenoptera genera